is a Tendai school Buddhist temple in the town of Hidakagawa, Wakayama Prefecture, Japan. Founded in the Nara period, it has given its name to a number of plays, most notably the Noh drama Dōjōji. The temple has numerous statues which are designated National Treasures, or Important Cultural Properties, as well as several structures with the Important Cultural Property designation. The precincts of the temple were designated a National Historic Site in 2013.

History
Although the foundation of the temple is not completely documented, it claims to have been founded in 701 AD at the request of Emperor Monmu, with the monk Gien (643-728) as its founder. According to folklore, Emperor Monmu acted on behalf of his wife, Fujiwara no Miyako, the mother of Emperor Shōmu. According to this legend, Fujiwara no Miyako was born to a family of ama fishermen in what is now the city of Gobō, Wakayama. Her parents were without children for many years but in response to fervent prayers to Hachiman, were gifted with a daughter; however the daughter was born completely bald. The village suffered from poor fishing, which they attributed to a mysterious light which had appeared at the bottom of the bay. Fujiwara no Miyako's mother, thinking that her daughter's affliction was due to some sins of a previous life, jumped into the water, intending to sacrifice herself to save the village. However, at the bottom of the bay she saw that the mysterious light was coming from a golden statue of Kannon Bosatsu, which she brought back to the surface. Afterwards, fishing returned to normal, and in a dream, Kannon appeared to her, and she asked for her daughters affliction to be cured. Soon afterwards, Fujiwara no Miyako grew thick strands of beautiful black hair. One day, as she was brushing her hair, a sparrow (or swallow) flew in, picked up some stray strands of hair and which it used to build a nest in the eaves of the mansion of Fujiwara no Fuhito, a powerful political figure in the imperial administration. On finding the long, beautiful hair, he sought out the owner, a welcomed Fujiwara no Miyako as his adopted daughter. She later caught the eye of the prince who would later become Emperor Monmu. However, as empress, she could not forget her hometown in Kii Province and especially the statue of Kannon Bosatsu which she left behind, so she petitioned her husband to have a temple built. This legend was told in the Heian period  and was subsequently re-told with many variations into the Edo period.

While the legend remains folklore, archaeological excavations have found traces of the layout of the original temple, and roof tiles to the early 8th century. Several excavations have been conducted since 1978 and the foundations  of the Nara period Main Hall, Pagoda, Middle Gate, Lecture Hall, and Cloister have been found. The cloister extended from the left and right sides of the Middle Gate and surrounded the site in a rectangular shape to the left and right sides of the Lecture Hall. Within the courtyard, the pagoda was to the east and the Main Hall was to the west. A Senjū Kannon statue was discovered during the dismantling and reconstruction of the Main Hall of the temple in 1985 and was found to be a Nara period work.

Most of the surviving Buddhist statues at the temple date from the early to mid-Heian period, which appears to be the peak of the temple's property. The existing Main Hall was completed in 1357. The temple went into decline from the Muromachi period and was largely burned down during Toyotomi Hideyoshi's conquest of Kii Province in 1585 (during which time the temple bell was looted). In 1655, the Main Hall was repaired by Tokugawa Yorinobu, the daimyō of Kishū Domain, and during the Edo period, structures such as a Niomon and a Three-story Pagoda were restored.

Cultural Properties

Buildings
 Hondō (1357); 7x5 bay, single-storey, irimoya-zukuri, tiled roof; (Important Cultural Property)
 Niōmon (1694); 3 bay, single-door rōmon, irimoya-zukuri, tiled roof; (Important Cultural Property)
 Three-storey pagoda (1763) (Prefecturally-designated Cultural Property)
 Shoin (1702) (Prefecturally-designated Cultural Property)

Statuary

  (Heian period) (National Treasure)
  (Heian period) (National Treasures)
  (Nara period) (Important Cultural Property)
  (Nara period) (Important Cultural Property)
  (Heian period) (Important Cultural Property)
  (Heian period) (Important Cultural Property)
  (Heian period) (Important Cultural Property)
  (Nanboku-chō period) (Prefecturally-designated Cultural Property)

Other
 , two scrolls (Muromachi period) (Important Cultural Property)
 Dōtaku (Yayoi period) (Prefecturally-designated Cultural Property)

Anchin and Kiyohime

The story of the monk  and his spurned lover  who, devoured by her passion and jealousy, turns into a serpent and pursues him to his destruction, is the subject of the Noh play Dōjōji, known for the rare prominence of its dramatic prop, the temple bell; as well as the Kabuki play Musume Dōjōji with its long onnagata buyō.

See also

 Dōjōji (Noh play)
 Japanese folklore
 List of National Treasures of Japan (sculptures)
List of Historic Sites of Japan (Wakayama)

References

External links
  Dōjō-ji - homepage
  Dōjō-ji - English language site

Buddhist temples in Wakayama Prefecture
Pagodas in Japan
Tendai temples
Important Cultural Properties of Japan
Hidakagawa, Wakayama
Religious organizations established in the 7th century